Litteau is a commune in the Calvados department in the Normandy region in northwestern France. The 19th-century poet Hippolyte Guérin was born in Litteau.

Population

See also
Communes of the Calvados department

References

Communes of Calvados (department)
Calvados communes articles needing translation from French Wikipedia